Valentin Baus (born 14 December 1995) is a German para table tennis player who competes in international level events. He is a double European champion and has won most team titles with Selcuk Cetin and Jan Gürtler.

References

External links

 
 

1995 births
Living people
German male table tennis players
Paralympic table tennis players of Germany
Paralympic silver medalists for Germany
Paralympic medalists in table tennis
Table tennis players at the 2016 Summer Paralympics
Table tennis players at the 2020 Summer Paralympics
Medalists at the 2016 Summer Paralympics
People with osteogenesis imperfecta
Sportspeople from Bochum